Triplophysa shaanxiensis is a species of ray-finned fish in the genus Triplophysa.

Footnotes 
 

S
Fish described in 1987